Partition is a 2007 English-language period film directed by Vic Sarin, written by Patricia Finn and Vic Sarin, and starring Jimi Mistry and Kristin Kreuk. The film is set in 1947, based on the Partition of India and was partially shot in Kamloops, British Columbia, Canada.

Determined to leave the ravages of war behind, 38-year-old Gian Singh (Jimi Mistry) resigns from the British Indian Army to a quiet life. His world is soon thrown in turmoil when he finds himself responsible for the life of a 17-year-old Muslim girl separated from her family and traumatised by the conflict of the Partition of India. Resisting all the taboos of religious divide, Gian finds himself slowly falling in love with the vulnerable Naseem (Kristin Kreuk).

Plot
Gian Singh is a Sikh who goes off to war in the British Indian Army with his two best friends Andrew and Avtar. The three are being seen off by Andrew's sister Margaret and Walter. Gian promises to look after Andrew only to resign after Andrew is killed. Gian is tortured by the guilt of not being able to save Andrew. The young Muslim woman Naseem (Kristin Kreuk) is separated from her family in riots and unaware that her father has been killed, hides in hope that the Sikh mobs won't find her.

Gian finds Naseem in the woods, having just returned to his home town near the Pakistani border. Their efforts to hide are foiled; Naseem and Gian are forced to bargain for Naseem's life with money. The townspeople, although initially resenting her presence, begin to accept Naseem, and it seems that the bad parts of their lives have faded away until night when both Naseem and Gian suffer from tortured visions of their past. These visions ultimately unite the two and they get married and have a son they call Vijay.

In love, the world seems perfect until Margaret shows up on Gian's doorstep with news that Naseem's family has been found in Pakistan. Naseem leaves to see them in Pakistan. She is to return in a month but does not arrive. Her two brothers, discovering her marriage to a Sikh, lock her up in her room and forbid her to ever return to India. Akbar, the eldest, is particularly stubborn, and vows to keep her away from her husband at all costs. Gian, tired of waiting, sets off on a trip to Pakistan to retrieve Naseem. He disguises himself as a Muslim, cutting off his hair and donning a Kofi. Even with the disguise he has to sneak across the border as his papers are not sufficient.

Gian meets with Walter and Margaret, who barely recognise him without his turban, and leaves Vijay with them while he goes to get Naseem. When he arrives, still dressed as a Muslim, Naseem immediately recognizes him. As they run toward one another they are stopped by her brothers and Akbar beats Gian. To explain himself to his neighbors he tells them that Gian is a Sikh. Meanwhile, Naseem has been locked up by her brother Zakir. Gian is hauled to jail and there he wallows in the darkness, refusing to return to India until he remembers that he has a son who needs him.

Naseem's mother, realizing that the couple are truly in love, frees Naseem, who runs to the train. She recognizes Vijay immediately and hugs him, unaware that Gian is just on the other side of the tracks. When he calls her name, they begin to fight through the crowd to reach one another. Just as they meet Akbar pulls them apart and begins a struggle with Gian. Gian is pushed over the railing onto the tracks just as the train arrives and is killed. Naseem sobs hysterically as she slowly collapses to the ground.

Naseem and Vijay escape on the train as the police arrive for Akbar. With the help of Margaret and Walter they move to England and Avtar spreads Gian's ashes given by Walter over a banyan tree.

Cast 
Jimi Mistry as Gian Singh / Mohammad Hassan
Kristin Kreuk as Naseem Khan
Neve Campbell as Margaret Stilwell
John Light as Walter Hankins
Irrfan Khan as Avtar Singh
Madhur Jaffrey as Shanti Singh
Arya Babbar as Akbar Khan
Lushin Dubey as Mumtaz Khan
Chenier Hundal as Zakir Khan
Jesse Moss as Andrew Stilwell
Jaden Rain as Vijay Singh
Lakha Lakhwinder Singh as Special Appearance

Nominations
2008 Genie Award for Best Achievement in Cinematography - Nominee
2007 Leo Award for Best Cinematography in a Feature Length Drama - Nominated
2007 Leo Award for Best Direction in a Feature Length Drama - Nominated
2007 Leo Award for Best Screenwriting in a Feature Length Drama - Nominated (with Patricia Finn)

Release
Partition is a co-production between Canada, South Africa and the United Kingdom. The film was released to Canadian theatres on February 2, 2007, with a subsequent Region one (US and Canada) DVD release on June 26, 2007.

See also
 List of Asian historical drama films

External links
 
 

2007 films
2007 independent films
2007 romantic drama films
British independent films
British romantic drama films
Canadian independent films
Canadian romantic drama films
South African drama films
South African independent films
English-language Canadian films
English-language South African films
Films scored by Brian Tyler
Films directed by Vic Sarin
Films set in the 1940s
Films set in the partition of India
Interfaith romance films
Indian interfaith romance films
2000s English-language films
2000s Canadian films
2000s British films